Athanasios Eftaxias (Greek: Αθανάσιος Ευταξίας, 1849 – 5 February 1931) was a Greek politician. He was born in Amfikleia, Phthiotis, and was briefly Prime Minister of Greece from July to August 1926. He died in Athens.

References

1849 births
1931 deaths
20th-century prime ministers of Greece
People from Phthiotis
Prime Ministers of Greece